The 2020–21 Dream11 Super Smash was the fourteenth season of the women's Super Smash Twenty20 cricket competition played in New Zealand. It ran from December 2020 to February 2021, with 6 provincial teams taking part. Canterbury Magicians beat Wellington Blaze in the final to win the tournament, their 5th Super Smash title.

The tournament ran alongside the 2020–21 Hallyburton Johnstone Shield.

Competition format 
Teams played in a double round-robin in a group of six, therefore playing 10 matches overall. Matches were played using a Twenty20 format. The top team in the group advanced straight to the final, whilst the second and third placed teams played off in an elimination final.

The group worked on a points system with positions being based on the total points. Points were awarded as follows:

Win: 4 points 
Tie: 2 points 
Loss: 0 points.
Abandoned/No Result: 2 points.

Points table

Source: ESPN Cricinfo

 Advanced to the Final
 Advanced to the Elimination Final

Fixtures

Round-robin

Finals

Statistics

Most runs

Source: ESPN Cricinfo

Most wickets

Source: ESPN Cricinfo

References

External links
Series home at ESPN Cricinfo

Super Smash (cricket)
2020–21 New Zealand cricket season
Super Smash (women's cricket)